The Rainbow Foods LPGA Classic was a golf tournament on the LPGA Tour from 1990 to 1998. It was played in the Minneapolis – Saint Paul, Minnesota area: at the Edinburgh USA Golf Course in Brooklyn Park from 1990 to 1996 and at the Rush Creek Golf Club in Maple Grove in 1997 and 1998.

Winners
Rainbow Foods LPGA Classic
1998 Hiromi Kobayashi

First Bank Presents the Edina Realty LPGA Classic
1997 Danielle Ammaccapane
1996 Liselotte Neumann
1995 Julie Larsen

Minnesota LPGA Classic
1994 Liselotte Neumann
1993 Hiromi Kobayashi

Northgate Computer Classic
1992 Kris Tschetter
1991 Cindy Rarick

Northgate Classic
1990 Beth Daniel

References

External links
Edinburgh USA Golf Course
Rush Creek Golf Club

Former LPGA Tour events
Golf in Minnesota
Women's sports in Minnesota